The Detroit Department of Transportation (DDOT, pronounced ) is the primary public transportation operator serving Detroit, Michigan. In existence since 1922, DDOT is a division of the city government, with headquarters in Midtown. Primarily serving Detroit and its enclaves, DDOT is supplemented by suburban service from the Suburban Mobility Authority for Regional Transportation (SMART).

History

Department of Street Railways 

The DDOT began its life as the Department of Street Railways (DSR) in 1922 after the municipalization of the privately-owned Detroit United Railway (DUR), which had controlled much of Detroit's mass transit operations since its incorporation in 1901.  The DSR added bus service when it created the Motorbus Division in 1925.  At the height of its operation in 1941, the DSR operated 20 streetcar lines with 910 streetcars. By 1952, only four streetcar lines remained: Woodward, Gratiot, Michigan and Jefferson. Streetcar services was discontinued in April 1956 with the decommissioning of the Woodward line. The DSR formally became the DDOT in 1974 under the Detroit City Charter.

2000s-present 
Between 2009 and 2012, the system's seven remaining limited and express bus routes (70, 71, 72, 73, 74, 76, and 78) were discontinued.

Starting January 1, 2012, management of DDOT was contracted out to Parsons Brinckerhoff, an engineering and management firm. The firm subsequently subcontracted the management of the system to Envisurage, LLC a consultancy run by the former CEO of the Rochester-Genesee Regional Transportation Authority. On March 3, 2012, 24-hour service was discontinued, and other weekday and weekend routes and services were pared down, or eliminated entirely, in an attempt to produce savings for the department. In August 2013, management of DDOT was contracted out to MV Transportation under the direction of Paul Toliver until September 2014. Dan Dirks was appointed director of the department by mayor Mike Duggan on January 9, 2014, for the duration of MV Transportation's contract. MV Transportation's contract was extended for another two years on August 12, 2014.

On January 23, 2016, DDOT reintroduced 24-hour service on three principal routes along with other smaller service changes.

On September 1, 2018, the system's ten most popular routes were branded as "ConnectTEN" and renumbered as routes 1–10, and received 24/7 service among other changes. The existing routes numbered 7, 9, and 10 were given higher route numbers to avoid conflict.

On November 6, 2022, the original State Fair Transit Center closed permanently, and was promptly demolished. A temporary transit center was constructed in a parking lot 500 feet to the north, and will be used until the new State Fair Transit Center opens in 2024.

Services

Fixed-route buses 
DDOT's primary service is fixed-route buses, mostly serving the city of Detroit and its enclaves, Hamtramck and Highland Park. Some routes service neighboring suburban communities, including Dearborn, Harper Woods, Livonia, Redford, River Rouge, and Southfield.

Bus service generally operates between 5 a.m. and 12:30 a.m. Monday through Saturday, while Sunday service starts approximately 7 a.m. and ends between 8 and 9 p.m. Routes 3–8, 10, 16 and 17 have 24/7 service.

Routes

Paratransit 
Along with fixed-route bus service, DDOT also offers MetroLift, an on-demand paratransit service. MetroLift service is operated by three private contractors: Checker Cab, Enjoi Transportation, and Lakeside Divisions.

Detroit Downtown Trolley 

The Detroit Downtown Trolley (originally the Detroit Citizens' Railway) was a heritage trolley built in 1976 as a U.S. Bicentennial project.  The trolley ran over a one-mile L-shaped route from Grand Circus Park to near the Renaissance Center, via Washington Boulevard and Jefferson Avenue, using narrow-gauge trams acquired from municipal rail services outside the U.S.  Most of the Detroit cars that saw service from 1976 to 2003 had been acquired from Lisbon, Portugal. Many Detroiters old enough to remember streetcar service from before 1956 were delighted with the nod to nostalgia that the service represented, but lack of business activity in downtown Detroit meant that ridership of the Downtown Trolley never became more than a novelty and declined to only about 3000 per year in the late 1990s; service was suspended in June 2003.

Fares 
Since 2019, DDOT, SMART, and the QLINE have had a unified fare payment system, Dart. Dart passes are available as digital passes through the Dart app, or as physical passes, which can be purchased from SMART's ticket offices in downtown Detroit and Royal Oak, the Rosa Parks Transit Center, SMART's online store, and select local businesses. 4-hour and 24-hour passes can be purchased with cash onboard buses.

Standard Fares 

^To receive discounted fares, seniors (age 65+) and disabled passengers must present either DDOT Special Fares ID card or state ID with visual impairment designation.

^^Medicare cardholders pay same rates as children 6–17, seniors at least 65 & disabled.

Fleet

Current Fleet

Retired Fleet

See also 

 Detroit People Mover
 Suburban Mobility Authority for Regional Transportation
 QLine

References

External links 
 Detroit Department of Transportation Website
 Transportation Riders United

Transportation in Detroit
Intermodal transportation authorities in Michigan
Bus transportation in Michigan
Public transportation in Michigan
Rail transportation in Michigan
Government of Detroit
Government agencies established in 1922
1922 establishments in Michigan